Hibbertia gracilipes is a species of flowering plant in the family Dilleniaceae and is endemic to the south-west of Western Australia. It blooms between March and December producing yellow flowers. First formally described in 1863 by George Bentham in Flora Australiensis, the specific epithet (gracilipes) means "thin foot", referring to the peduncles.

This species is found in the Avon Wheatbelt, Coolgardie, Esperance Plains, Jarrah Forest and Mallee biogeographic regions in the south-west of Western Australia where it grows on rocky hillsides and sandplains.

See also
List of Hibbertia species

References

gracilipes
Flora of Western Australia
Plants described in 1863
Taxa named by George Bentham